Sauers is a surname. Notable people with the surname include:

 Gene Sauers (born 1962), American professional golfer
 Isidor Sauers (born 1948), Austrian-American physicist

See also
Sauer (surname)